Lea Newbold is a former civil parish, now in the parish of Aldford and Saighton, in the Borough of Cheshire West and Chester and ceremonial county of Cheshire in England. In 2001 it has a population of 8. The civil parish was abolished in 2015 to form Aldford and Saighton.

See also

Listed buildings in Lea Newbold

References

External links

Former civil parishes in Cheshire
Cheshire West and Chester